Grief of War is a death / thrash metal band that was formed in Tokyo, Japan in 2002. The band grew in popularity after they released their demo material, a self-titled collection, in Japan. In 2004, after playing on stages and garnering a healthy response, the band signed to local label Yggr Drasill. In May 2005, the band released their debut album, A Mounting Crisis...As Their Fury Got Released. The band signed an international deal with Prosthetic Records, which re-released the album on February 19, 2008.

Demo Recordings
 Inception (2003)
 Screaming Assault Live! (2004)

Discography 
 A Mounting Crisis...As Their Fury Got Released (2005), Yggr Drasill Records
 A Mounting Crisis...As Their Fury Got Released (2008), Prosthetic Records
 Worship (2009), Prosthetic Records
 Act of Treason (2016), Walküre Records

External links 
 
 grief of War page on Prosthetic Records

Japanese death metal musical groups
Japanese thrash metal musical groups
Musical groups established in 2002
Musical quartets
2002 establishments in Japan
Musical groups from Tokyo